Ivy Tan, also known as Chen Ai Wei, is a Singaporean radio and TV presenter. She worked as a radio DJ for Singapore-based Chinese music station YES 933, which she joined in 2007. Ivy started out her radio career through a talent search organised by the station, which she emerged the champion out of hundreds of hopefuls.

Apart from radio and TV hosting, Tan is also an on-site emcee, producer, voice-over talent and has done quite a few cameos on TV dramas and talk shows.

Tan is bilingual in English and Chinese, and she has expressed interest to pick up a third language, Spanish.

Early life and education 
Tan was born in Singapore, to a Malaysian father and Taiwanese mother. She spent the first 6 years of her life shuttling around these countries, and even spent one year living in Wales, England, where her father was doing his master's degree. The family eventually settled in Singapore, where she was educated and raised.

Tan attended Ngee Ann Polytechnic, where she obtained a diploma in Mass Communications. This was the period when she discovered her interest and love for radio. After a few years of working in an advertising firm, she went back to school and achieved her degree in Mass Communications from RMIT University.

Career 
Tan started as a freelance emcee for events at the age of 19.

Ivy started her radio career in 2007, when she joined the DJ Search competition organised by YES 933. She emerged the champion out of hundreds of hopefuls and scored a contract with Mediacorp as a Radio Jockey.

Tan is the first full-time DJ the station signed on immediately from a competition.

Radio 
Ivy has hosted a wide range of programs on air. From morning drive time to late night talk shows. She is most remembered for her hilarious "Jaws" series with partner Dennis Chew, and late night talk show "Utopia".

TV 
Ivy has hosted a wide variety of programs on-screen. She is often the "go-to girl" for backstage/behind-the-scenes because of her quick wit and funny personality.

Interviews 
Ivy is no stranger to celebrities and has chalked up an impressive list of interviewees, including Jay Chou, May Day, Eason Chan, Beast, Big Bang, G-Dragon, S.H.E and Aaron Kwok.

Personal life 
Tan is known to be an avid diver and has traveled around Asia in search of amazing dive sites. She believes strongly in putting a stop to shark finning and is a supporter of Shark Savers campaign "I'm finished with fins".

References

External links
Ivy Tan

Singaporean people of Chinese descent
Singaporean radio people
Living people
Year of birth missing (living people)